Montana Public Radio is a network of public radio stations serving the U.S. state of Montana, primarily the western part of the state. The network is currently owned by the University of Montana, and its studios are located on the university campus in Missoula, with a satellite facility in Great Falls. The network is affiliated with National Public Radio. Programming originates from flagship station KUFM (89.1 FM) in Missoula, Montana.

History
Montana Public Radio began in 1965 when KUFM in Missoula signed on as a 10-watt campus radio station. In 1974, it became a member of National Public Radio.

Starting in the late 1970s, it began building translators across western Montana. Its first full-power satellite, in Great Falls, signed on in 1984. In 1999, a signal extension project funded mostly by a federal grant made it possible to sign on new stations in Kalispell and Hamilton and upgrade translators in Butte and Helena to full-power stations.

Satellites and repeaters
Montana Public Radio consists of nine full-power stations and several translators:

Notes:

References

External links
Montana Public Radio's official web site

 
 
Broadcast media of the University of Montana

NPR member networks
Radio stations established in 1965
1965 establishments in Montana